Wilson Roberto Neves Bento de Carvalho (born 4 July 1993) is a Portuguese footballer who plays for  club Kings Langley as a winger.

He spent his youth with Fulham, Stevenage and Port Vale. He spent 2012 to 2019 playing for a multitude of non-league clubs, including: North Greenford United, Hemel Hempstead Town, Ilkeston, Corby Town, Canvey Island, Kettering Town, Oxford City and Stratford Town. With Corby Town he won the Southern League Premier Division title in 2014–15 and he lifted the Southern League Cup with Stratford Town in 2019. He was signed by Accrington Stanley in July 2019 and made his debut in the English Football League the following month. He joined Macclesfield Town in September 2020, though the club were liquidated later in the month. He then signed for Hampton & Richmond Borough in October 2020. He played for Hendon and Walton Casuals in the 2021–22 campaign, and then spent time with Hayes & Yeading United, Westfield and Kings Langley the following season.

Career

Non-League
Carvalho spent his youth at the centre of excellence at Stevenage after leaving Fulham's Academy. He went on join the Nike Academy and was signed to Port Vale's youth team after impressing on trial at Birmingham City. He never made a first-team appearance at Vale Park, though was loaned out to Southern League Premier Division side Hemel Hempstead Town for one month after the "Tudors" suffered an injury crisis in November 2013. On 6 December, he joined Hempstead's divisional rivals Corby Town on a one month loan deal. On 10 January, he was loaned out to Northern Premier League Premier Division side Ilkeston and featured in three games for the "Robins" during a one month stay. He was released by "Valiants" manager Micky Adams in April 2014.

He signed with Corby Town and scored 11 goals in 51 appearances across the 2014–15 campaign as Tommy Wright's "Steelmen" won promotion as champions of the Southern League Premier Division. Corby also reached the final of the League Cup, but lost out to Poole Town on away goals. He had trials at Yeovil Town and Scottish Premiership club Heart of Midlothian in summer 2015. He had a successful trial at Braintree Town, but instead signed with Isthmian League Premier Division club Canvey Island on dual registration forms.

He joined Kettering Town in November 2015. He was handed a six-game ban for spitting in a game against Bedworth United. He said that "I have definitely learned a few lessons" from the incident. He ended the 2015–16 campaign with 12 goals from 29 games and went on to add a further eight goals from 34 appearances in 2016–17. He signed with Oxford City on 9 February 2017, having previously played under manager Mark Jones in the youth-team at Stevenage. He featured 15 times for the "Hoops".

On 20 March 2018, he rejoined former club Kettering Town. He played nine games for the "Poppies" in what remained of the 2017–18 season. On 6 August 2018, he was one of four players to sign a contract with Stratford Town of the Southern League Premier Division Central. A key player for Town, he scored 15 goals from 52 games in the 2018–19 season, helping the club to reach the play-offs and the League Cup final. They were beaten 3–1 by King's Lynn Town in the play-off semi-finals, but managed to beat Cinderford Town 1–0 in the League Cup final.

Accrington Stanley
On 23 July 2019, he signed  a one-year deal with the option of a further year at League One side Accrington Stanley after impressing manager John Coleman on trial in pre-season friendlies. Assistant manager Jimmy Bell had previously coached him in Port Vale's development squad. He scored his first goal for Stanley in a 2–1 victory over Fleetwood Town in an EFL Trophy tie on 3 September. He was one of five players released by the club at the end of the 2019–20 season.

Return to non-League
Wilson was unveiled as signed for Macclesfield Town on 7 September 2020. The club was wound up a few days later, on 16 September. He signed for National League South club Hampton & Richmond Borough in October 2020. He scored one goal in 17 appearances in the 2020–21 season, which was curtailed early due to the COVID-19 pandemic in England. He was handed a six-match ban by The Football Association after being sent off for spitting in a game with Bedworth United.

He joined Southern League Premier Division South side Hendon in July 2021. He scored two goals on his debut in a 4–0 win at Truro City on 14 August, the first of three goals in thirteen games for the "Greens". On 23 November 2021, he signed with divisional rivals Walton Casuals. He played 14 games in what remained of the 2021–22 season. Walton Casuals folded on 9 June 2022. In August 2022, Carvalho signed for Hayes & Yeading United, before signing for Westfield later that month, and for Kings Langley in September 2022.

Style of play
Carvalho is a pacey winger.

Career statistics

Honours
Corby Town
Southern League Premier Division: 2014–15
Southern League Cup runner-up: 2015

Stratford Town
Southern League Cup: 2019

References

1993 births
Living people
Footballers from Lisbon
Portuguese footballers
Fulham F.C. players
Stevenage F.C. players
Nike Academy players
North Greenford United F.C. players
Port Vale F.C. players
Hemel Hempstead Town F.C. players
Corby Town F.C. players
Ilkeston F.C. players
Canvey Island F.C. players
Kettering Town F.C. players
Oxford City F.C. players
Stratford Town F.C. players
Accrington Stanley F.C. players
Macclesfield Town F.C. players
Hampton & Richmond Borough F.C. players
Hendon F.C. players
Walton Casuals F.C. players
Hayes & Yeading United F.C. players
Westfield F.C. (Surrey) players
Kings Langley F.C. players
Association football wingers
Portuguese expatriate footballers
Portuguese expatriates in England
Expatriate footballers in England
Southern Football League players
Northern Premier League players
Isthmian League players
National League (English football) players
English Football League players